Harney may refer to:

Places in the United States
 Harney, Maryland, an unincorporated community
 Harney, Minnesota, an unincorporated community
 Harney Basin, arid basin in south-east Oregon
 Harney County, Oregon
 Harney Lake, shallow alkali lake basin in south-east Oregon
 Harney National Forest (1911-1954), in South Dakota and Wyoming
 Fort Harney, a former U.S. Army outpost in Oregon
 Lake Harney, Florida
 Black Elk Peak formerly Harney Peak, highest mountain in South Dakota

Other uses
 Harney (surname)
 Harney and Sons, American tea company based in Connecticut
 Harney Westwood & Riegels (or Harneys), law firm founded in 1960 in the British Virgin Islands